Gérard Bonal (18 April 1941 – 13 June 2022) was a French writer and biographer.

Biography
A former journalist with Réalités and GEO, Bonal became a writer. He specialized in the works of Colette, founding the magazine Les Cahiers Colette in 1975. He devoted several works to the author, such as Colette intime. In 1995, he wrote his first play, Colette Music-Hall, presented at the Théâtre de la Huchette. He wrote the script for two documentaries as well: Colette, premier portrait  (1995) and J'appartiens à un pays que j'ai quitté (2004). He served as president of the Société des amis de Colette and was vice-president of the association "La Maison de Colette".

Gérard Bonal died on 13 June 2022 at the age of 81.

Distinctions
Knight of the Ordre des Arts et des Lettres
Officer of the Order of Merit of the Italian Republic

Publications

Novels
La Lanceuse de couteaux (1971)
Paysage avec la chute d'Icare (1973)
L'Amateur d'images (1980)
Premières neiges de l'absence (1984)
L'Hôtel des Cinq-Continents (1993)

Essays
Colette par moi-même (1982)
Besoin de province (2002)
Saint-Germain-des-Prés (2008)
Des Américaines à Paris (2017)
Colette et les bêtes (2019)

Biographies
L'Album Gérard Philipe (1999)
Les Renaud-Barrault (2000)
Simone de Beauvoir (2001)
Un acteur dans son temps, Gérard Philipe (2003)
Colette intime (2004)
Gérard Philipe (2009)
Colette (2014)
Joséphine Baker, du music-hall au Panthéon (2021)

Collections
Colette journaliste (2010)
Colette (2011)
Lettres à Colette (2012)
Un bien grand amour, Lettres de Colette à Musidora (2014)

Theatre
Colette Music-hall (1995)
Madame Colette a-t-elle une âme ? (2007)
Chéri (2011)
Madame Max (2015)

Documentaries
Colette (1995)
Colette : « J'appartiens à un pays que j'ai quitté » (2004)
Les Renaud-Barrault, bâtisseurs de théâtre (2000)
Gérard Philipe, un homme pas un ange (2003)
Martine Carol, plus dure sera la chute (2017)

References

1941 births
2022 deaths
20th-century French writers
21st-century French writers
French biographers
Writers from Paris
Chevaliers of the Ordre des Arts et des Lettres
Officers of the Order of Merit of the Italian Republic